William Brodleck Herms (1876–1949) was an American entomologist.

1876 births
1949 deaths
American entomologists